An accrual bond is a fixed-interest bond that is issued at its face value and repaid at the end of the maturity period together with the accrued interest. In Germany, the accrued interest is compounded. In contrast to zero-coupon bonds, accrual bonds have a clearly stated coupon rate.

See also 

Bonds (finance)